The Blackpool Sixth Form College is a co-educational state funded sixth form college serving the Fylde and surrounding areas in Lancashire, England. The college has around 2,000 full-time students. It offers academic and applied programmes to a wide range of students aged between 16 and 19.

Location
The campus is sited in the Highfurlong district of Blackpool. This places it on Blackpool's extreme eastern boundary, about 3 miles from the coast and close to the neighbouring town of Poulton-le-Fylde.

Education and college life
Over 60 A-levels are available to full-time students. Until 2004, the college specialised in the A-level qualification almost exclusively - however, the college has gradually introduced more and more BTECs for students to take at the same level. The curriculum areas cover the traditional academic subjects - arts, sciences, languages, economics and mathematics - as well as more modern courses like film and television production and criminology.

The college's performing arts and music students frequently deliver productions in the college theatre, which can seat 300 guests.

Students can also participate in wide range of recreational activities. The college has 17 sports teams, and also a basketball academy and a very active Duke of Edinburgh Award scheme.

The college is fully accessible and is equipped with engineering facilities and an on-site gym. Some courses are completed almost entirely digitally. Various technology, including cameras, tablets and laptops are available to borrow or loan.

Results
86% of students continue to university, including at Oxford, Cambridge, Harvard, Princeton, The London School of Economics, and Durham; and 13% successfully begin alternative further education, such as apprenticeships.

History

The college was opened in 1971 as a dedicated sixth form centre for the nearby Collegiate Grammar School, although it has always attracted students from other schools across the Fylde and beyond. In 1989, the sixth form centre controversially separated from the main school to become a fully independent college. Since then, the number of students has increased enormously and the campus has been extended by several new buildings.

2004 saw the opening of the new Performing Arts building, the Holland building, comprising specialist music and dance facilities, new Social Sciences and History accommodation and extensions to the Library and Common Room areas.

In 2005 the Dining Room was refurbished, a shop was added and a Student Services centre was opened. All College buildings are designated as 'no smoking' for students and staff.

In 2011, Blackpool Sixth Form College was also awarded 'Teaching School Status' in partnership with nearby Hodgson Academy.

Building works which began in 2011 were finished in Summer 2015, after £29 million was put into the project, which included a Starbucks in the foyer beyond reception.

Principals
 Joan Wilkinson (1971-1983)
 Robert Farrand (1983-1989)
 Christopher Fulford (1989-2000)
 Jeffrey Holland (2000-2004)
 Felicity Greeves (2004-2015)
 Jill Gray (2015-)

The Blackpool Sixth Form College Alumni Society
The college has an Alumni Society for former students, staff and governors.

Notable former students
 Barney Harwood, children's television presenter
 Dan Forshaw (musician)
Little Boots (Victoria Hesketh), musician

John Robb - musician
Lucy Fallon - actress
Justine Moore - paralympic fencer

References

External links
 Blackpool Sixth Form College website

Sixth form colleges in Lancashire
Buildings and structures in Blackpool
Education in Blackpool
Educational institutions established in 1971
1971 establishments in England